Fujisankei Communications International, Inc. (FCI) is the American arm of the Fujisankei Communications Group, a Japanese media conglomerate of television and radio channels, magazine, newspaper, record and video game companies. The Fujisankei Communications Group regroups more than 90 companies, like Fuji TV in Japan, among others. Founded in 1986 in New York City and owned by Fuji Media Holdings, FCI makes productions from the Fujisankei Communications Group available to the United States and the rest of the western world.

FCI was involved with videogame publishing as well, being one of the early third-party licensees for Nintendo Entertainment System (NES) starting in 1987. Originally, FCI merely published in North America translations of video games that were released in Japan mainly by Pony Canyon, another company from the Fujisankei Communications Group. FCI was well-known at this time for the many RPG and Adventure games they released for the NES as conversions from PC games, such as the Advanced Dungeons & Dragons and Ultima series. Later, FCI began contracting outside development houses to create original games; examples include WCW Super Brawl Wrestling and WCW: The Main Event, both developed by Beam Software of Australia; Might & Magic III, developed by Iguana Entertainment; and Metal Morph and the Runes of Virtue titles in the Ultima series, both developed by Origin Systems. FCI had a long partnership with Origin, starting when Pony Canyon was hired to translate the Ultima PC games for Japan, strengthening through the conversion of Ultima III, IV and V for the NES, followed by Ultima VI and VII for the Super NES, and continuing through the end of FCI's videogame department; a conversion of Origin's PC game Wing Commander II to the Super NES was in development for release by FCI when they closed their video games division. In the mid-1990s, FCI abandoned video game distribution to concentrate on television operations.

FCI has contracts with television stations in New York City, Hawaii and California to air programming segments. Since 1999, Fuji TV, through FCI, has forbidden foreign TV stations from subtitling its dramas, a practice that is criticized and has alienated some fans of the genre.

The company continues to be based in Manhattan, but has since moved from its original offices to its current location around 1988–1989. FCI also has secondary offices in the United States, Europe and Egypt.

Published games

NES
 Advanced Dungeons & Dragons: DragonStrike
 Advanced Dungeons & Dragons: Heroes of the Lance
 Advanced Dungeons & Dragons: Pool of Radiance
 Advanced Dungeons & Dragons: Hillsfar
 Bard's Tale, The
 Breaktime
 Dr. Chaos
 Hydlide
 Lunar Pool
 MagMax
 Phantom Fighter
 Seicross
 Ultima III: Exodus
 Ultima IV: Quest of the Avatar
 Ultima V: Warriors of Destiny
 WCW Wrestling
 Zanac

Super NES
 Metal Morph 
 Might and Magic III: Isles of Terra
 SimEarth: The Living Planet 
 Ultima VI: The False Prophet 
 Ultima VII: The Black Gate
 WCW SuperBrawl Wrestling
 Ultima: Runes of Virtue 2 
 Worlds of Ultima: The Savage Empire

Game Boy
 Boxxle 
 Boxxle 2
 Bubble Ghost 
 Out of Gas
 Panel Action Bingo
 Tasmania Story
 Ultima: Runes of Virtue
 Ultima: Runes of Virtue 2 
 WCW: The Main Event

Sega CD
 Advanced Dungeons & Dragons: Eye of the Beholder

Unpublished games
 Advanced Dungeons & Dragons: Curse of the Azure Bonds
 WCW Super Brawl Wrestling (Genesis)
 Might and Magic III: Isles of Terra (Genesis)
 Wing Commander II (Super NES)

Curse of the Azure Bonds was abandoned due to difficulties during development. The remaining games were in development.

References

External links
  

Companies based in New York City
American companies established in 1986
Home video companies of the United States
Mass media companies of the United States
Mass media companies of Japan
Video game companies of the United States
1986 establishments in New York City
Fujisankei Communications Group

ja:フジサンケイ・コミュニケーションズ・インターナショナル